Ada is an unincorporated community in Lane County, Oregon, United States, at the intersection of Fiddle Creek, Canary, and Ada Roads, about 10 miles Southeast of the junction of Canary Road with Oregon Highway 101. Nearby Siltcoos Lake is the location of the Ada Park and fishing resort.

The community was named for Miss Ada Wilkes (later Ada Cleveland), daughter of Benjamin and Jaretta Wilkes, longtime residents of the area. The community is not only one of Oregon's rare place names attributed to a first name, but is also an even rarer Oregon palindromic place name. Also noteworthy is the fact that when founded in 1892, Ada was located in Douglas County and later entered Lane County only after a 1903 boundary change. The Ada Resort on Siltcoos Lake and nearby Ada Park also are in Douglas County.

References 

Unincorporated communities in Lane County, Oregon
1892 establishments in Oregon
Populated places established in 1892
Unincorporated communities in Oregon